Linde is a surname. Notable people with the surname include:

Andrei Linde, Russian physicist
Bo Linde, Swedish composer
Carl von Linde, German engineer who developed refrigeration and gas separation technologies
Dennis Linde, American songwriter
George Linde, South African cricketer
Hans-Martin Linde, flute and recorder player
Hans A. Linde, retired justice of the Oregon Supreme Court
Iluta Linde (born 1972), Latvian curler
Johan Linde, Australian boxer
Klaus Linde, German alternative medicine researcher
Leif Linde (born 1955), Swedish politician
Marie Linde (1894–1963), South African author
Peter Linde, Swedish sculptor
Steve Linde (born 1960), newspaperman